The 2001 Toronto Phantoms season is the 5th season for the franchise, their first season in Toronto. The Phantoms finished the regular season with an 8–6 record, and beat the New York Dragons in the Wild Card round of the playoffs before falling to the Nashville Kats in the Quarterfinals.

Standings

Regular season schedule

Playoff schedule

Roster

References

External links
 

Toronto Phantoms
Toronto Phantoms seasons
Toronto Phantoms